Artem Romanovych Kozak (born 28 May 1998) is a Ukrainian football midfielder who plays for Polissya Zhytomyr.

Club career
He made his Ukrainian Premier League debut for FC Arsenal Kyiv on 24 February 2019 in a game against FC Desna Chernihiv.

Honours
Chornomorets Odesa
 Ukrainian First League: 2020-21

References

External links
Profile on Official website of Polissya Zhytomyr
 

1998 births
People from Kovel
Living people
Ukrainian footballers
Ukraine youth international footballers
Association football midfielders
FC Arsenal Kyiv players
FC Karpaty Lviv players
FC Chornomorets Odesa players
Ukrainian Premier League players
Ukrainian First League players
Ukrainian expatriate footballers
Expatriate footballers in Greece
FC Polissya Zhytomyr players
Sportspeople from Volyn Oblast